The 8th New York Cavalry Regiment, also known as the "Rochester Regiment," was a regiment of the Union Army that fought during the American Civil War. It was a volunteer unit organized in Rochester on November 14, 1861, and left the state on November 29. It was mustered out on June 27, 1865.

Service
The regiment served at various times in the defense of Washington D.C., in the Department of the Shenandoah, in the Middle Department and in the Army of the Potomac.

When the regiment was mustered out, June 27, 1865, it was commanded by Colonel Edmund Mann Pope. In total, the regiment lost 324 men, including 19 officers and 305 enlisted men.

Major Hartwell B. Compson, Second Lieutenant Andrew Kuder, Second Lieutenant Robert Niven (soldier), Sergeant James Congdon, Sergeant Charles A. Goheen, and Corporal Henry H. Bickford all received the Medal of Honor for their actions during the Battle of Waynesboro, Virginia on March 2, 1865.

First Lieutenant Morton A. Read received the Medal of Honor for his actions during the Battle of Appomattox Station on April 8, 1865.

See also
List of New York Civil War regiments

References

Further reading
Norton, Henry. Deeds of daring; or, history of the Eighth N.Y. volunteer cavalry, containing a complete record of the battles, skirmishes, marches, etc., that the gallant Eighth New York cavalry participated in, from its organization in November, 1861, to the close of the rebellion in 1865. Compiled and edited by Henry Norton. Norwich, NY: Chenango Telegraph printhouse, 1889.

External links
8th NY Cavalry Regiment during the Civil War, New York State Military Museum 

Cavalry 008
Military units and formations established in 1861
Military units and formations disestablished in 1865
1861 establishments in New York (state)